Jalan Lapangan Terbang Antarabangsa Kota Kinabalu or Kota Kinabalu International Airport Road, Federal Route 608, is a federal road in West Coast Division, Sabah, Malaysia.

Features

At most sections, the Federal Route 608 was built under the JKR R5 road standard, with a speed limit of 90 km/h.

List of junctions and town

References

Malaysian Federal Roads